Some industrial narrow-gauge railways  in the United Kingdom and the Isle of Man were primarily built to serve quarrying, mining, and similar industries. Some of these narrow-gauge railways offered passenger services for employees or workmen, but they did not run public passenger trains. They are listed by the primary industry they served.

Cement works 

Many of the cement works and their associated chalk pits had narrow gauge railways, particularly those in the South East of England. The Associated Portland Cement Manufacturers Ltd. (APCM, later Blue Circle Industries, and Lafarge) was the major producer of cement in the United Kingdom in the second half of the twentieth century and many of their plants used railways.

Lime works

Brickworks

Clay extraction

China clay extraction 

In Britain large deposits of Kaolinite (commonly known as "china clay") were found in Cornwall. Many industrial railways, both narrow gauge and standard gauge, were built to serve the china clay quarries and mines of this area.

Sand and gravel extraction 

The sand and gravel extraction industries made extensive use of narrow gauge railways, and several of these lasted into the 1980s – this was one of the last industries to make significant use of narrow gauge industrial railways in the UK.

Stone quarrying and mining

Slate 

The most well-known of the British industrial narrow gauge railways were those serving the slate industry of north Wales. Many of the quarries had internal tramways and feeder lines connecting them to transhipment points on local railways, rivers, roads or coastal ports.

Granite

Other stone

Coal 

The British coal mining industry made extensive use of narrow gauge railways, particularly underground where the restricted size of the tunnels meant that narrow gauge lines were and are particularly well suited. Many National Coal Board (NCB) mines used railways both underground and in the stock yards above ground. There were also many short lines at private mines, particularly in south Wales and the Forest of Dean regions.

Peat extraction

Other mineral extraction

Metal mining

Tin, lead and zinc

Iron 

Mainly ironstone quarries

Gold

See also 
British industrial narrow-gauge railways
British narrow-gauge railways
Industrial railway

References

Bibliography 
 
 
 
 
 
 
 
 
 
 
 
 
 
 Narrow Gauge News, the journal of the Narrow Gauge Railway Society

External links 
 Narrow Gauge Railway Society
 Industrial Railway Society

Mining in the United Kingdom
 
Industrial railways in the United Kingdom
Quarrying in the United Kingdom
British, narrow gauge railways